Reckless Abandon is the debut album by Andrew F. It was released on "May 22, 2008", and it received a small number of sales in its first week released, causing it to debut at #71 on the Canadian Albums Chart. The first released single "The End" peaked at #10 on the Canadian Hot 100 based on the number of downloads, and has been certified gold by the CRIA.

Track listing
All songs were written by Andrew F.

Chart positions

References

2008 debut albums